Einsiedeln is a municipality and district in the canton of Schwyz in Switzerland known for its monastery, the Benedictine Einsiedeln Abbey, established in the 10th century.

History

Early history

There was no permanent settlement in the area prior to the early medieval period, but numerous artefacts left by prehistoric hunters, dated to the Mesolithic to Bronze Age were recovered.

The original "hermitage" is associated with St. Meinrad, a Benedictine monk family of the Counts of Hohenzollern. According to legend, Meinrad lived on the slopes of Mt. Etzel from 835 until his death in 861.

During the next eighty years Saint Meinrad's hermitage was never without one or more hermits emulating his example. One of the hermits, named Eberhard, previously Provost of Strasburg, erected a monastery and church there, of which he became first abbot. Work on the monastery is said to have begun in 934. Following a miraculous vision by Eberhard, the new church was dedicated to the Virgin Mary.
At the time of the foundation of the Abbey, the local hunters and small farmers of the forest, placed themselves under the authority of the noble-born Abbot. The surrounding population was known as Waldleute (forest people) because of the forests around the Abbey. The Abbey encouraged the Waldleute to settle in surrounding villages and begin farming.  The settlement of EInsiedeln is first mentioned in 1073.

The alpine valleys were used to raise cattle, which became increasingly more important to the village. By 1250 the major business in the village was breeding and raising cattle. Expansion of grazing land into nearby alpine valleys led to a two century conflict with Schwyz.

Old Swiss Confederacy

As early as 1100, the villages of Einsiedeln and Schwyz were in conflict over land near the two Mythen mountains. Over the following century, conflicts over the land led to many court battles and actual battles. In 1173 when the Habsburgs gained rights over the village of Schwyz and in 1283 when they raised the Abbey to an independent principality under the Habsburgs, this raised a local conflict into a regional one. The Habsburgs were able to quiet the conflict for a few years, until 1291 when Schwyz, Uri and Unterwalden revolted against the Habsburgs. In 1314 the conflict flared up again with an attack by Schwyz into Einsiedeln. This attack triggered a series of border raids that, along with other events, in 1315 led to a Habsburg invasion and their crushing defeat at the Battle of Morgarten. It wasn't until 1350 that the conflict was resolved and the borders between Einsiedeln and Schwyz were fixed.

In 1394 the Abbey came under the protection of Schwyz and the rights of high justice went over to Schwyz. Low justice though remained with the Abbey. 
Einsiedeln is the birthplace of Paracelsus, a Renaissance physician and alchemist who is credited with first naming zinc.

In 1399 the Drei Teile ("Three Parts": a council that included the Abbey, the Waldleute from the surrounding villages, and Schwyz) is first mentioned. Initially the Drei Teile only addressed any issues that affected the free Waldleute. In 1564 they were able to issue a binding ordinance for all three groups. 
In 1657 the Drei Teile changed its name to the "Session".
The relationship between the three parties was not always smooth. In 1764, an attempt by the Abbot to require tradesmen to only practise their trade in Einsiedeln and preventing skilled workers from settling in among the Waldleute led to open conflict. Schwyz supported the Abbey against the Waldleute and in 1766 crushed the revolt. However, the Abbey lost much of its independence and thereafter was treated more as a subject of Schwyz instead of a partner.

Modern history
During Napoleon's invasion of Switzerland in 1798, the Abbey was suppressed for about three years and the land was added to the city of Schwyz. Following the collapse of the post-invasion Helvetic Republic, in 1803 as part of the Act of Mediation Einsiedeln became a Bezirk (or District) in the Canton of Schwyz. During the Restoration starting in 1815, the Abbey's power began to grow in the Canton. A desire for reform led the Districts of March, Küssnacht and Pfäffikon to declare themselves Kanton Schwyz äusseres Land (Canton of Schwyz, Outer Lands) with a liberal constitution in 1832. The Abbey stood on the side of the conservative faction in the Canton, which caused tense relations between them and the surrounding villages until the creation of the Federal State in 1848.

Geography

Einsiedeln is situated in the valley of the Alp river. It comprises six localities: Bennau, Egg, Willerzell, Euthal, Gross and Trachslau. The village of Biberbrugg is shared with the municipality of Feusisberg. The rest of the land is either settled (5.5%) or non-productive (less than 2.8%).

It is on a plateau (ca.  above sea level). The town is located at an altitude of  higher than Zurich, with which it has a railway connection.

Einsiedeln is also the capital and only municipality of the District of Einsiedeln.

Demographics

, 13.4% of the population was made up of foreign nationals. Over the last 10 years the population has grown at a rate of 14.8%. Most of the population speaks German  (92.3%), with Serbo-Croatian being second most common (1.9%) and Albanian being third (1.4%).

 the gender distribution of the population was 50.4% male and 49.6% female. The age distribution, in Einsiedeln is; 3,211 people or 25.4% of the population is between 0 and 19. 3,628 people or 28.7% are 20 to 39, and 3,964 people or 31.4% are 40 to 64. The senior population distribution is 1,009 people or 8.0% are 65 to 74. There are 609 people or 4.8% who are 70 to 79 and 201 people or 1.59% of the population who are over 80. There is one person in Einsiedeln who is over 100 years old.

 there are 5,093 households, of which 1,649 households (or about 32.4%) contain only a single individual. 347 or about 6.8% are large households, with at least five members.

In the 2007 election the most popular party was the SVP which received 43.5% of the vote. The next three most popular parties were the CVP (18.8%), the FDP (17.7%) and the SPS (14.8%).

The entire Swiss population is generally well educated. In Einsiedeln about 66% of the population (between age 25-64) have completed either non-mandatory upper secondary education or additional higher education (either university or a Fachhochschule).

Einsiedeln has an unemployment rate of 1.29%.  , there were 551 people employed in the primary economic sector and about 209 businesses involved in this sector. 1,630 people are employed in the secondary sector and there are 199 businesses in this sector. 3,017 people are employed in the tertiary sector, with 486 businesses in this sector.

Of the rest of the population, there are less than 5 individuals who belong to the Christian Catholic faith, there are 288 individuals (or about 2.28% of the population) who belong to the Orthodox Church, and there are 5 individuals (or about 0.04% of the population) who belong to another Christian church. There are 332 (or about 2.63% of the population) who are Islamic. There are 106 individuals (or about 0.84% of the population) who belong to another church (not listed on the census), 486 (or about 3.85% of the population) belong to no church, are agnostic or atheist, and 329 individuals (or about 2.61% of the population) did not answer the question.

Historic population
The historical population is given in the following table:

Transport 
Einsiedeln railway station is a terminal station of the Zürich S-Bahn on the lines S13 and S40, provided by the Südostbahn.

Climate
Between 1961 and 1990 Einsiedeln had an average of 156.7 days of rain per year and on average received  of precipitation. During this month there was precipitation for an average of 15.3 days. The month with the most days of precipitation was May, with an average of 15.3, but with only  of precipitation.

Sports

Schanzen Einsiedeln is the national ski jumping venue of Switzerland.

Tourism

The village of Einsiedeln is a popular tourist destination in central Switzerland. The Benedictine Einsiedeln Abbey, located within the village, is considered one of the most important Roman Catholic pilgrimage sites in Europe and is called "the most important place of pilgrimage dedicated to the Virgin Mary in Switzerland". In addition to the Abbey, Einsiedeln is also a popular destination for sports year round. The village has 3 ski areas which include lifts as well as ski jumps.

Since the Middle Ages the Graces Chapel and a statue of the Black Madonna have been the centerpiece of the pilgrimage. The statue is so famous that a copy can also be seen in the French Jura town of Pontarlier. Between 150,000 and 200,000 pilgrims visit the Graces Chapel each year.

Besides being a site for pilgrimages, Einsiedeln is a tourist destination for those interested in winter sports. The village has its own ski jump, ski lifts, ski tows and winter sports centres, which are in the nearby area of Hoch-Ybrig and Brunni. The Schwedentritt cross-country skiing trail starts next to the Einsiedeln Abbey.

The nearby reservoir, Sihlsee, is used in summer for swimming, surfing and sailing, and in the winter for ice-skating. The dam, which retains the lake, produces electricity for the trains and protects the city of Zurich further down the valley from the flood of the Sihl.

These days, fewer pilgrims come to Einsiedeln. For that reason, some of the former hotels have now closed. At the same time, the village has experienced a boom with day tourists, owing to the clear air and mountain views. Because of the high quality of life locally, the population is growing faster than is normal in Switzerland.

Notable people 

 Paracelsus (1493 in Egg – 1541) physician, alchemist and astrologer of the German Renaissance 
 Albrecht von Bonstetten (c.1443 – c.1504) a Swiss humanist, entered Einsiedeln Abbey at a young age, made deacon of Einsiedeln in 1469
 Johann Baptist Babel (1716 – 1799) preeminent sculptor of Baroque era, settled in Einsiedeln in 1746
 Joseph Charles Benziger (1762–1841) founded the Catholic publishing house RCL Benziger
 Gall Morel (1803 - Einsiedeln Abbey 1872) a poet, scholar, aesthete and educationist
 Joseph A. Steinauer (1834 – 1907) Swiss Immigrant to America, who, with his two brothers, founded Steinauer, Pawnee County, Nebraska
 Aloysius Maria Benziger (1864 – 1942) a Swiss Catholic bishop and pioneer missionary
 Meinrad Lienert (born in 1865 – 1933) a Swiss writer, poet, journalist and editor
 Artur Beul (born in 1915 – 2010) a Swiss songwriter
 Lee Scratch Perry (1936 – 2021) Jamaican record producer and musician
 Eric Honegger (born 1946) a Swiss politician and business man, lives in Einsiedeln
 Milica Pavlović (born 1991) Serbian pop-folk singer
 Sport 
 Josef Wehrli (born 1954) a Swiss former professional racing cyclist
 Marcel Fässler (born 1976) a Swiss professional racing driver.
 Andreas Küttel (born 1979) a Swiss former Ski Jumper "World Champion 2009"

References

External links 

 

Einsiedeln - Place of Culture and Pilgrimage at visit-einsiedeln.ch

 
Cities in Switzerland
Municipalities of the canton of Schwyz
Districts of the canton of Schwyz